Sinhŭng station is a railway station in Sinhŭng-ŭp, Sinhŭng county, South Hamgyŏng province, North Korea on the Sinhŭng Line of the Korean State Railway. It is the changing point between the standard and narrow gauge sections of the line. There are facilities for servicing the locomotives and rolling stock of the narrow gauge line here, and there is a short (narrow gauge) branch to P'ungdŏk, an industrial halt in Sinhŭng-rodongjagu.

History 
The station, originally called Hamnam Sinhŭng station, was opened on 1 October 1926 by the Sinhŭng Railway as part of the  third section of its Hamnam Line between P'ungsang and here. The Sinhŭng Railway was bought and absorbed by the Chosen Railway on 22 April 1938. It received its current name after the establishment of the DPRK.

References

Railway stations in North Korea
Buildings and structures in South Hamgyong Province
Railway stations opened in 1926
1926 establishments in Korea